Didymothallus is a genus of viviparous brotulas found in the Indian and western Pacific Oceans.

Species
There are currently four recognized species in this genus:
 Didymothallus criniceps Schwarzhans & Møller, 2007
 Didymothallus mizolepis (Günther, 1867) (Smalleye cusk)
 Didymothallus nudigena Schwarzhans & Møller, 2011
 Didymothallus pruvosti Schwarzhans & Møller, 2007

References

Bythitidae